The 2021 Berlin Marathon was a marathon race held on 26 September 2021. It was the 47th edition of the annual Berlin Marathon. It was the first edition of the Berlin Marathon to take place after the start of the COVID-19 pandemic in 2019. The 2020 Berlin Marathon was cancelled as a result of the COVID-19 pandemic. The race was the first of the five World Marathon Majors held in 2021; all the events in the series took place in the space of six weeks between late September and early November.

The marathon was won by Guye Adola and Gotytom Gebreslase, both of Ethiopia, in 2:05:45 and 2:20:09, respectively, while the wheelchair race was won by Marcel Hug and Manuela Schär, both of Switzerland, in 1:24:03 and 1:37:31, respectively.

Results
Results for the top ten in the running races and top three in the wheelchair races are listed below.

References

External links 
 Official website

2021 in Berlin
Berlin Marathon
Berlin Marathon
Berlin Marathon
Berlin Marathon